Bonny Doon is an American indie rock band from Detroit, Michigan. The band consists of Jake Kmiecik (drums), Bill Lennox (guitar/vocals) and Bobby Colombo (guitar/vocals).

History
Bonny Doon began in 2014. In the following year, they released their first collection of songs, demos they had recorded that turned into a self-titled EP. In 2017, the group announced their debut self-titled full-length album, he album was released by Salinas Records on March 10, 2017. In 2018, the band released their second full-length album titled Longwave via Woodsist Records. 

In 2020, the group became the backing band for musician Waxahatchee. In September of 2022, the group signed to Anti- Records and released a new song, "San Francisco", featuring Waxahatchee.

The band's third full-length album, Let There Be Music, will be released on June 16, 2023.

Discography
Studio albums
Bonny Doon (2017, Salinas)
Longwave (2018, Woodsist)
Let There Be Music (2023, Anti-)
Demos
Bonny Doon (2015, Salinas)

References

Indie rock musical groups from Michigan
Musical groups from Detroit
21st-century American musicians
Musical groups established in 2014
2014 establishments in Michigan